Limba Română is a magazine from the Republic of Moldova founded in 1991 by Ion Dumeniuc.

History
Alexandru Bantoș has been the editor in chief since 1992. Leo Bordeianu was a secretary-general (1991–2002). The magazine is sponsored by the Romanian Cultural Institute.

References

External links 
 Limba Română
 Timpul de dimineață, Limba româna are propriul său site
 e-literatura: „Limba Română”, (şi) pe Internet
 Limba Româna - ortografia.ro - Sa scriem si sa ne exprimam corect in limba româna.

1991 establishments in Moldova
Magazines established in 1991
Literary magazines published in Moldova
Romanian-language magazines